SAGANet.org (Social Action for Grassroots Astrobiology Network – www.saganet.org) is a social and collaborative web-platform created to connect scientists with the public, leveraging the increasing ubiquity of social media as a platform to engage the nation's youth.

Background 
SAGANet was founded in 2011 by Blue Marble Space Institute of Science scientists Zach Adam MSc, Julia DeMarines MSc, Heshan Illangkoon Ph.D., Betül Kaçar Ph.D., Sanjoy Som Ph.D., and Sara Imari Walker Ph.D. and was officially launched on April 12, 2012 (51 years after the first launch of a human into space and 31 years after the first launch of the Space Shuttle Columbia, (STS-1), and was announced publicly at the 2012 Astrobiology Science Conference.

SAGANet is named after the late Carl Sagan (The acronym is used with courtesy of the Carl Sagan Foundation) and builds upon his vision of a citizenry actively engaged in learning about the cosmos. SAGANet is designed to be an immersive virtual community where non-scientist and scientist members interact in an environment of shared learning. SAGANet is currently funded by Blue Marble Space with support from the NASA Astrobiology Institute.

Mission 
Equipped with a rich interface for communication (forums, user-defined interest groups, multi-user video calls and text chat), information sharing (document creation, video feed, activity statuses, photo, video and audio uploads), and social media (Facebook, Twitter, google+ and flickr integration), SAGANet. fills a previously unoccupied niche on the World Wide Web by providing a science-focused social environment around the broad and interdisciplinary field of astrobiology and space exploration.

Member Demographics 
As of March 2013, SAGANet hosts over 600 members, including students, scientists, educators, outreach coordinators, journalists, science communicators, and science enthusiasts.  The SAGANet community therefore represents a diverse group of individuals with varying expertise and interest in STEM-related disciplines. Representing  many of the site's active members, scientist members have found SAGANet. to be a hub for both combating the “Sagan effect” by providing an easy and safe-environment for communicating science, and to informally participate in STEM education by directly connecting with the students and members of the public.

Events
SAGANet organizes several events on the site that engage the general public.
1) “Talk to an Astrobiologist” is a monthly event where a distinguished scientist is invited to interact with S.A.G.A.N. members. Past guest have included Dr. David Grinspoon and Dr. Paul Davies.
2) SAGANet salon is a monthly event where members of the community interact on a topic bordering science and philosophy
3) SAGANet Book Club is a biweekly event where book club members discuss relevant books, chapter by chapter, in the readers (multi-user video) chat.
4) Weekly seminars. As of March 2013, Arizona State University and Stockholm University stream their academic seminars on S.A.G.A.N.

Mentoring 
A core activity of SAGANet is to pilot mentoring via social media, by linking member scientists with scientists and educators that interact through the communication tools available on the network. Two elementary schools in California and Arizona are interacting with SAGANet mentors.

Related Links
S.A.G.A.N.
S.A.G.A.N. Facebook & Twitter Page
Blue Marble Space
Blue Marble Space Institute of Science
NASA Astrobiology Institute
The Carl Sagan Foundation

References

Organizations established in 2011
Science communication
Popular science